Neil Diamond is a Cree-Canadian filmmaker based in Montreal, Quebec, Canada, born and raised in Waskaganish, Quebec. Working with Rezolution Pictures, Diamond has directed the documentary films Reel Injun, The Last Explorer, One More River, Heavy Metal: A Mining Disaster in Northern Quebec and Cree Spoken Here, along with three seasons of DAB IYIYUU, a series for the Aboriginal Peoples Television Network about Cree elders.

In the 2008 docudrama The Last Explorer, Diamond explored the story of his great-uncle George Elson, a Cree guide who helped to map Labrador as part of an ill-fated 1903 expedition with Leonidas Hubbard and Dillon Wallace, and a return voyage in 1905 with Hubbard's widow Mina Hubbard.

As of April 2011, Diamond is developing a project with Inuit filmmaker Zacharias Kunuk about the 18th-century conflict between Cree and Inuit, which lasted almost a century.

Reel Injun

Reel Injun was inspired by Diamond's own experiences as a child in Waskaganish, where he and other Native children would play cowboys and Indians after local screenings of Westerns in their remote community. Diamond remembers that although the children were in fact "Indians," they all wanted to be the cowboys. Afterwards, when he was old enough to move south to study, he would be questioned by non-Native people about whether his people lived in teepees and rode horses, causing Diamond to realize that their preconceptions about Native people were also derived from movies. These stereotypes motivated him to help America see the true identity of what a Native American was.

Awards
Diamond received the award for Best Direction in a Documentary Program at the 2010 Gemini Awards for Reel Injun. It also earned him a 2011 Peabody Award.

References

External links
Native Networks biography

Cree people
First Nations filmmakers
Canadian documentary film directors
Film directors from Montreal
Canadian television directors
Canadian Screen Award winners
People from Eeyou Istchee (territory)
Peabody Award winners
Living people
Year of birth missing (living people)